The Ambassador of Australia to Hungary is an officer of the Australian Department of Foreign Affairs and Trade and the head of the Embassy of the Commonwealth of Australia in Hungary. The Australian Government established an embassy in Budapest in October 1984, and appointed its first resident Ambassador, Oliver Cordell. Previously, responsibility for Australian diplomatic representation in Hungary was held in Austria (1971–1985). At the time, Bill Hayden, then Australian Minister for Foreign Affairs, said that closer ties with Hungary could help Australia to encourage dialogue between the United States and the Soviet Union on matters such as disarmament.

The Australian Embassy in Budapest closed in July 2013. The Government at the time said the closure was because of budget constraints. Currently, the Australian Ambassador to Hungary is accredited from Vienna. The current ambassador, since 2019, is Richard Sadleir.

List of ambassadors

References

Hungary
Australia